Redstone Historic District may refer to:

Redstone Historic District (Colorado), listed on the National Register of Historic Places in Pitkin County, Colorado
Redstone Historic District (Burlington, Vermont), listed on the National Register of Historic Places in Chittenden County, Vermont